Fabricio Rodrigues da Silva Ferreira (born 7 May 1999), commonly known as Bill, is a Brazilian footballer who plays as a winger for Inter de Limeira, on loan from Dnipro-1.

Career statistics

Club

Notes

References

External links

1999 births
Living people
Brazilian footballers
Brazilian expatriate footballers
Association football forwards
Campeonato Brasileiro Série A players
Campeonato Brasileiro Série B players
Ukrainian Premier League players
Latvian Higher League players
Nova Iguaçu Futebol Clube players
CR Flamengo footballers
Associação Atlética Ponte Preta players
Clube de Regatas Brasil players
SC Dnipro-1 players
Sport Club do Recife players
FK RFS players
Associação Atlética Internacional (Limeira) players
Brazilian expatriate sportspeople in Ukraine
Expatriate footballers in Ukraine
Brazilian expatriate sportspeople in Latvia
Expatriate footballers in Latvia
People from Bedford Roxo